Las Juanas is a Mexican telenovela created Bernardo Romero Pereiro, based on the 1997 Colombian telenovela of the same name written by the same creator. The series originally aired from September 6, 2004 to March 4, 2005.

It stars Fernando Luján, Margarita Sanz, Ana Serradilla, Martha Higareda, Paola Núñez, Claudia Álvarez, Vanessa Cato, and Andrés Palacios.

Plot 
"Las Juanas" is the story of five sisters in a forgotten little town reminiscent of Gabriel García Marquez’s hundred years of solitude; headed by Juana Valentina (Ana Serradilla), a brave dreamer who, upon her mother’s death, discovers the true identity of her father, Calixto Matamoros (Fernando Luján).  Juana Valentina decides to go in search of her father and discovers that not only was she an illegitimate child, she was not the only one, as her father’s romantic adventures included four other women (in addition to his wife) with whom he also procreated other daughters. This strange twist of fate places Juana Valentina in the Calixto household where she meets Álvaro (Andrés Palacios), whom she falls madly in love with at first sight, until she discovers the possibility that he is her half brother, which seems to impede their love forever. While we wait for fate to reveal the truth, Juana Valentina meets her sisters: Juana Micaela (Paola Núñez), Juana Carolina (Martha Higareda), Juana Martina and Juana Prudencia (Claudia Álvarez).  Not only do these women garner more than one stolen glance in town for their great beauty and charms, they come together to create a new family, under the protection of Calixto himself, forever bound by the ties of blood that joins them. Each one will find their love and destiny in the little town of Tierra Caliente.

Cast

Main 
 Fernando Luján as Calixto Matamoros
 Margarita Sanz as Doña Gallardo de Matamoros
 Ana Serradilla as Juana Valentina
 Martha Higareda as Juana Carolina
 Paola Núñez as Juana Micaela
 Claudia Álvarez as Juana Prudencia
 Vanessa Cato as Juana Martina
 Andrés Palacios as Juan Álvaro

Recurring 
 Carmen Beato as Carlota
 José Carlos Rodríguez as Carmelo
 Alma Rosa Añorve as Guillermina
 Juan Pablo Medina as Eliseo
 Guillermo Iván as Miguel
 Cynthia Vázquez as Clara Mercedes
 Jean Duverger as Todomundo
 Faisy as Gualberto
 Andrés Montiel as Gabriel Gallardo
 Alejandro Barrios as Rodrigo
 Maribel Rodríguez as Gertrudis

References

External links 
 

2004 telenovelas
Mexican telenovelas
TV Azteca telenovelas
2004 Mexican television series debuts
2005 Mexican television series endings
Television shows set in Mexico
Mexican television series based on Colombian television series
Spanish-language telenovelas